Masayuki Tanimoto is an electrical engineer from Nagoya University, Japan. He was named a Fellow of the Institute of Electrical and Electronics Engineers (IEEE) in 2013 for his contributions to the development of free viewpoint television and its MPEG standard.

References

Fellow Members of the IEEE
Living people
Academic staff of Nagoya University
21st-century American engineers
Year of birth missing (living people)
Place of birth missing (living people)